Bank of Taiwan is a Taiwanese basketball team that plays in the Super Basketball League in Taiwan. The team was established in 1973 by the Bank of Taiwan, and later joined the SBL in 2003.

SBL regular season records
 2003–2004 season: 7th place
 2004–2005 season: 6th place
 2005–2006 season: 4th place
 2006–2007 season: 7th place
 2007–2008 season: 7th place
 2008–2009 season: 7th place
 2009–2010 season: 7th place
 2010–2011 season: 5th place
 2011–2012 season: 7th place
 2012–2013 season: 5th place
 2013–2014 season: 7th place
 2014–2015 season: 5th place
 2015–2016 season: 6th place
 2016–2017 season: 7th place
 2017–2018 season: 7th place
 2018–2019 season: 7th place
 2019–2020 season: 4th place
 2020–2021 season: 3rd place
 2021–2022 season: 1st place

Championships
2021–2022
 Champions: Bank of Taiwan
 Runners-up: Taiwan Beer

Current roster

Notable players
 Rod Benson
Chen Shun-Hsiang 
Douglas Creighton 
Jung-Hsuan Chang 
 Jason Faulknor

Head coaches

Retired numbers

References

Super Basketball League teams
Basketball teams established in 1973
1973 establishments in Taiwan